Leigh Marning (born 8 February 1979 in Taree, New South Wales, Australia) is a rhythmic gymnast who represented Australia in the 1998 Commonwealth Games. She now works as a contortionist and freelance circus performer and trainer, specializing in aerials, contortion and hula hoops.

Marning trained at the National Institute of Circus Arts in Melbourne, Australia from 2001 to 2003 and was later accepted into the Cirque du Soleil show KÀ in Las Vegas.

External links
 Rhythmic Gymnastic Profiles
 Circus Oz
 Rhythmic Gymnastics | View topic - Transition into the Cirque Du Soleil..Rebecca Jose etc..

1979 births
Living people
Australian rhythmic gymnasts
People from Taree
Commonwealth Games medallists in gymnastics
Commonwealth Games silver medallists for Australia
Commonwealth Games bronze medallists for Australia
Gymnasts at the 1998 Commonwealth Games
Sportswomen from New South Wales
20th-century Australian women
21st-century Australian women
Medallists at the 1998 Commonwealth Games